This is a list of the current and former vice presidents of the Philippines by time in office consisting of the 14 vice presidents in the history of the Philippines. The basis for this list is counted by the number of calendar days.

Rank by time in office

Updated daily according to UTC

Philippines, vice presidents